Yemen competed at the 2004 Summer Olympics in Athens, Greece, from 13 to 29 August 2004.

Athletics

Yemeni athletes have so far achieved qualifying standards in the following athletics events (up to a maximum of 3 athletes in each event at the 'A' Standard, and 1 at the 'B' Standard).

Men

Swimming

Men

Taekwondo

Yemen has qualified a single taekwondo jin.

See also
 Yemen at the 2002 Asian Games

References

External links
Official Report of the XXVIII Olympiad

Nations at the 2004 Summer Olympics
2004
Summer Olympics